Aliens: Infestation is a 2011 2D sidescroller game for the Nintendo DS handheld console. It was developed by WayForward Technologies and Gearbox Software. It is a tie-in to the Alien franchise. The cover art as well as the character designs and avatars were drawn by comic book artist Chris Bachalo.

The game received generally positive reviews, with many calling it a successful callback to the original Alien series and an improvement over the previous games, with particular praise towards the atmosphere, graphics and art design.

Gameplay 
Gameplay of Aliens: Infestation is comparable to the Metroid video games, where players are encouraged to search and backtrack for weapons, upgrades, and keys. The player controls one of a party of four marines and explores the U.S.S. Sulaco as well as LV-426 and Phobos in order to investigate the Union of Progressive Peoples (UPP) and Weyland-Yutani's involvement in Xenomorph development. The game incorporates a permadeath mechanic. If a marine falls in battle, another in the party will take their place. The player loses if the entire party is wiped out. Fallen characters can be replaced with any of fifteen displaced marines found throughout the game, each with their own unique dialog.

Plot
The USS Sephora has discovered the USS Sulaco adrift in space after the events of Aliens and Alien 3. The Colonial Marines are sent aboard the Sulaco to investigate and recover the life form detected aboard the ship.

Development 
Aliens: Infestation was developed by WayForward Technologies and Gearbox Software and was originally intended to be a tie-in to the PC and console Aliens: Colonial Marines game. When doing their research, game director Adam Tierney focused heavily on Ridley Scott's Alien and James Cameron's Aliens as inspiration. To capture the films' slasher appeal, while still keeping the player emotionally invested, the development team created 20 unique characters, with the game's dialogue re-written 20 times, to make sure it offered the biggest 'gut-punch' when one dies. In conjunction with the game's 'party of four' mechanic, the developers wanted players to grow attached to their favorites, which, in-turn, increased the likelihood of getting one killed.

Reception 

Aliens: Infestation received "generally favorable reviews" according to the review aggregation website Metacritic.

Digital Spy gave it four stars out of five, saying, "In many ways, it feels like the Aliens game we should have been given back in the 16-bit era when the movie series was still relatively new. Whether it has been worth the wait is debatable, but this is certainly a worthy addition to the DS library."  However, The Digital Fix gave it seven out of ten, saying that "It can be uneven at times in terms of quality but it is highly enjoyable, especially if you are fan of either the franchise or even if you are just a fan of 'Metroidvania' games."

References

External links 
 
  

2011 video games
Alien (franchise) games
Fiction set on Phobos (moon)
Nintendo DS games
Nintendo DS-only games
Sega video games
Side-scrolling video games
Video games developed in the United States
Video games featuring female protagonists
Gearbox Software games
Metroidvania games
Single-player video games
WayForward games